Leptophobia cinerea, the cinerea white, is a butterfly in the family Pieridae. It is found from Ecuador to Bolivia.

Adults have black markings on the upperside. The underside of the hindwings is dull brown.

Subspecies
The following subspecies are recognised:
Leptophobia cinerea cinerea (Ecuador)
Leptophobia cinerea menthe (Hopffer, 1874) (Peru, Bolivia)

References

Pierini
Butterflies described in 1867
Pieridae of South America
Taxa named by William Chapman Hewitson